William Randolph "Cozy" Cole (October 17, 1909 – January 9, 1981) was an American jazz drummer who worked with Cab Calloway and Louis Armstrong among others and led his own groups.

Life and career 
William Randolph Cole was born in East Orange, New Jersey, United States. His first music job was with Wilbur Sweatman in 1928. In 1930, he played for Jelly Roll Morton's Red Hot Peppers, recording an early drum solo on "Load of Cole". He spent 1931–33 with Blanche Calloway, 1933–34 with Benny Carter, 1935–36 with Willie Bryant, 1936–38 with Stuff Smith's small combo, and 1938–42 with Cab Calloway. In 1942, he was hired by CBS Radio music director Raymond Scott as part of network radio's first integrated orchestra. After that he played with Louis Armstrong's All Stars.

Cole performed with Louis Armstrong and his All Stars with Velma Middleton singing vocals for the ninth Cavalcade of Jazz concert held at Wrigley Field in Los Angeles. The concert was produced by Leon Hefflin, Sr. on June 7, 1953. Also featured that day were Roy Brown and his Orchestra, Don Tosti and His Mexican Jazzmen, Earl Bostic, Nat "King" Cole, and Shorty Rogers and his Orchestra.<ref>“More Big Names in Cavalcade” Article in ..Los Angeles Sentinel, May 21, 1953.
</ref>

Cole had hits with the songs "Topsy I" and "Topsy II". "Topsy II" peaked at No. 3 on the Billboard Hot 100, and at No. 1 on the R&B chart. It sold over one million copies and was awarded a gold disc. The track peaked at No. 29 in the UK Singles Chart in 1958. The recording contained a long drum solo and was one of the few drum solo recordings to make the charts at Billboard magazine. The single was issued by Love Records, a small record label in Brooklyn, New York. Cole's song "Turvy II" reached No. 36 in 1959.

Cole appeared in music-related films, including a brief cameo in Don't Knock the Rock. Throughout the 1960s and 1970s he continued to perform in a variety of settings alongside names like Jonah Jones, Stuff Smith, and Cab Calloway. Cole and Gene Krupa often played drum duets at the Metropole in New York City during the 1950s and 1960s.

In 1978, Capital University in Columbus, awarded Cole an honorary degree of Doctor of Musical Arts. Cole is cited as an influence by many contemporary rock drummers, including Cozy Powell, who took his nickname "Cozy" from Cole. In 1981, he died of cancer in Columbus, Ohio.

Cole was the teacher of Philly Joe Jones.

Discography
As leader
 Earl's Backroom and Cozy's Caravan (Felsted, 1958) – album shared with Earl Hines
 The Drummer Man with the Big Beat (King, 1959)
 Cozy Cole Hits! (Love, 1959)
 A Cozy Conception of Carmen (Charlie Parker, 1962)
 Hot and Cozy with Hot Lips Page (Continental, 1962)
 It's a Cozy World (Coral, 1964)
 It's a Rocking Thing! (Columbia, 1966)
 Concerto for Cozy (Savoy, 1975)
 Lionel Hampton Presents: Cozy Cole and Marty Napoleon (Who's Who in Jazz, 1977)
 Nice All Stars (Black and Blue, 1978)

As sideman
 Red Allen, Al Jazzbo Collins Jazz at the Metropole Cafe (Bethlehem, 1955)
 Red Allen, Ride, Red, Ride in Hi-Fi (RCA Victor, 1957)
 Red Allen, At Newport (Verve, 1957)
 Louis Armstrong, Satchmo On Stage (Decca, 1957)
 Cab Calloway, Hi De Ho Man (Columbia, 1974)
 Johnny Guarnieri, Tony Mottola, Bob Haggart, An Hour of Modern Piano Rhythms (Royale, 1959)
 Lionel Hampton, Who's Who in Jazz Presents: Lionel Hampton (Philips, 1977)
 Cass Harrison, Wrappin' It Up (MGM 1957)
 Earl Hines & Jonah Jones & Buddy Tate, Back On the Street (Chiaroscuro, 1972)
 Jonah Jones, Trumpet On Tour (Baronet, 1962)
 Wingy Manone, Wingy Manone Vol. 1 (RCA, 1969)
 Jimmy McPartland, Zutty Singleton, Miff Mole, Wild Bill Davison Dixieland at Carnegie Hall Forum (Circle, 1958)
 Jelly Roll Morton, Mr. Jelly Lord (RCA Victor, 1967)
 Sammy Price, Barrelhouse and Blues (Jazztone, 1955)
 Rex Stewart, Rex Stewart and the Ellingtonians'' (Riverside, 1960)

Singles

References

External links
 Drummerworld: Cozy Cole - includes video and sound clips
 Cozy Cole on Continental Records in the 1940s
Discogs.com
 Cozy Cole recordings at the Discography of American Historical Recordings.

Swing drummers
American jazz drummers
African-American drummers
1909 births
1981 deaths
Musicians from East Orange, New Jersey
Savoy Records artists
Deaths from cancer in Ohio
20th-century American drummers
American male drummers
20th-century American male musicians
American male jazz musicians
The Cab Calloway Orchestra members
20th-century African-American musicians